is a Japanese master of Shotokan karate.
He has won the JKA's version of the world championships for kumite. He has also won the JKA All-Japan championships for kumite on 2 occasions.
He is currently an instructor of the Japan Karate Association.

Biography

He studied at Tohoku Gakuin University.

Competition
Toshihiro Mori has had considerable success in karate competition.

Major Tournament Success
25th JKA All Japan Karate Championship (1982)  - 2nd Place Kumite
24th JKA All Japan Karate Championship (1981)  - 3rd Place Kumite
3rd IAKF World Karate Championship (Bremen, 1980)  - 1st Place Kumite
23rd JKA All Japan Karate Championship (1980)  - 1st Place Kumite
22nd JKA All Japan Karate Championship (1979)  - 2nd Place Kumite
21st JKA All Japan Karate Championship (1978)  - 1st Place Kumite

References

 

Japanese male karateka
Karate coaches
Shotokan practitioners
Sportspeople from Miyagi Prefecture
Living people
Year of birth missing (living people)